Magyar Narancs (Hungarian Orange in English) is a weekly liberal magazine with a strong satirical tone appearing on Thursdays in Hungary. It is informally referred to as Mancs (Paw in English) which is a joking abbreviation of the name. The magazine was first published in October 1989. Its headquarters are in Budapest. It includes articles mainly on politics, culture and sociology.

See also
 List of magazines in Hungary

References

External links

1989 establishments in Hungary
Hungarian-language magazines
Magazines established in 1989
Magazines published in Budapest
News magazines published in Europe
Political magazines published in Hungary
Weekly magazines published in Hungary